Klemen Medved (born 10 November 1988) is a Slovenian football midfielder who plays for SV Gralla.

External links
Player profile on footballdatabase.eu
PrvaLiga profile 

1988 births
Living people
Slovenian footballers
Association football midfielders
Association football fullbacks
Slovenian PrvaLiga players
Slovenian Second League players
NK Maribor players
NK Aluminij players
NK Nafta Lendava players
NK Drava Ptuj players
NK Celje players
NK Krka players
Slovenia youth international footballers
Slovenia under-21 international footballers
Slovenian expatriate footballers
Expatriate footballers in Austria
Slovenian expatriate sportspeople in Austria